Rueben Jacob Randle (born May 7, 1991) is a former American football wide receiver. He was drafted by the New York Giants in the second round of the 2012 NFL Draft. He played college football at Louisiana State University (LSU). He has also spent time with the Philadelphia Eagles, Chicago Bears and Winnipeg Blue Bombers.

High school career
Randle attended Bastrop High School in Bastrop, Louisiana, where he played both wide receiver and quarterback in his senior year due to the graduation of quarterback Randall Mackey. That year, Randle connected on 166 of 274 passes (60.6 completion percentage) for 2,442 yards and 20 touchdowns, while also rushing for a team-high 680 yards and 12 more scores.

His sophomore year, when Bastrop won the state championship, Randle had 14 catches for 433 yards and seven touchdowns. As a junior, Randle had 55 receptions for 1,058 yards and 11 touchdowns, earning him a Class 4A All-Louisiana designation. Randle earned All-American honors by Parade, USA Today, and SuperPrep, and was a participant in the 2009 U.S. Army All-American Bowl.

In addition to football, Randle also participated in basketball, baseball and track at Bastrop.

College recruiting
As one of the top-rated prospects in the nation, Randle was a consensus five-star prospect by all major recruiting services. Randle was considered a five-star recruit by Rivals.com, as well as the No. 1 wide receiver prospect and the No. 2 overall prospect in the nation. Randle had numerous scholarship offers, but on February 4, 2009 (National Signing Day), he committed to Louisiana State University via letter of intent. He also considered Alabama, Oklahoma, Oklahoma State and Miami.

College career
In three seasons at LSU, Randle caught 97 passes for 1,634 yards and 13 touchdowns. As a junior, he was a first-team All-Southeastern Conference (SEC) selection by SEC coaches, and earned second-team honors from the Associated Press. Following LSU's loss in the 2011 National Championship game vs. Alabama, Randle announced his intention to enter the upcoming NFL draft.

Professional career

New York Giants
On April 27, 2012, Randle was drafted by the New York Giants in the 2nd round of the 2012 NFL Draft. On May 11, Randle signed his rookie contract with the Giants.

He totaled 188 receptions for 2,644 yards and 20 touchdowns in his four-year tenure with the Giants.

Philadelphia Eagles
On March 23, 2016, Randle signed a one-year contract worth roughly $3 million with the Philadelphia Eagles. He was released on August 28.

Chicago Bears
On January 10, 2017, Randle signed a reserve/future contract with the Chicago Bears. On August 13, 2017, Randle was placed on injured reserve with a hamstring injury. He was released on September 12, 2017.

Winnipeg Blue Bombers 
On May 22, 2018 the Winnipeg Blue Bombers of the Canadian Football League (CFL) announced they had signed Randle to a contract.  He was released on June 9.

References

External links
NFL Combine bio
LSU Tigers bio

1991 births
Living people
African-American players of American football
American football wide receivers
LSU Tigers football players
People from Bastrop, Louisiana
Players of American football from Louisiana
New York Giants players
Philadelphia Eagles players
Chicago Bears players
Winnipeg Blue Bombers players
21st-century African-American sportspeople